White Brotherhood may refer to:

White Brotherhood, an urban society (or militia) of Toulouse, France established in 1211
Great White Brotherhood, belief systems akin to Theosophy and New Age, said to be perfected beings of great power who spread spiritual teachings through selected humans
Universal White Brotherhood, a New Age-oriented religious movement founded in Bulgaria in the early 20th century by Peter Deunov and established in France in 1937 by Omraam Mikhaël Aïvanhov (1900–1986), one of his followers. Their teachings are also known as "Dunovism"
White Brotherhood, a white supremacist group akin to the Ku Klux Klan

See also
Black Brotherhood, an urban society (or militia) established in Toulouse in 1211 in response to the White Brotherhood
Marina Tsvigun, co-founder of the New Community of Enlightened Humanity, also known as the White Brotherhood